John Curtis (3 September 1791 – 6 October 1862) was an English entomologist and illustrator.

Biography
Curtis was born in Norwich to Frances and Charles Morgan Curtis.  Charles Morgan died before his son had reached the age of 4 years. His mother, Frances, had a passion for flowers and was a professional flower grower. She encouraged her son to study natural history with a young local naturalist, Richard Walker (1791–1870). At the age of 16 John became an apprentice at a local lawyer's office in Norwich but devoted his spare time to studying and drawing insects and, with insect collecting becoming a growing craze, he found he could make a living selling the specimens he found. At this time he became a friend of Simon Wilkin (1790–1862) a wealthy land owner in Norfolk, eventually leaving his job to live with Wilkin at Cossey Hall where the extensive natural history library and specimen collection afforded him the opportunity to study his emerging over-riding passion, entomology. Through Wilkin he met the entomologists William Kirby and William Spence. 

In pursuit of his passion he learned how to etch and engrave copper plates leading to his first published work, the five coloured plates and twenty uncoloured outline drawings in Kirby and Spence's An Introduction to Entomology (1815–1826).

In 1819 William Kirby accompanied Curtis to London where Curtis met Sir Joseph Banks, president of the Royal Society. Banks introduced him to Sir William Elford Leach superintendent of the Zoological Collection of the British Museum with whom Curtis studied conchology. Leach, in turn, introduced him to James Charles Dale who soon became his patron. 

In 1824 Curtis began his monumental masterwork, British Entomology: Being Illustrations and Descriptions of the Genera of Insects Found in Great Britain and Ireland, still widely considered as the finest nineteenth century work on the subject. It was published in monthly parts by subscription from 1824 to 1839, each part comprising 3 or more plates with descriptive texts ranging from usually 2 to as many as 10 pages. The finished work comprised 16 volumes each of 12 parts, 192 parts in all together with 770 plates (1 to 769 plus 205*), available either coloured or plain. Georges Cuvier (1769–1832) described the illustrations of British Entomology as "the paragon of perfection".

More complete details of his professional career are given in the obituary published by the Linnaean Society in 1862 (below). 

By 1840 Curtis's eyesight was beginning to fail, worsening  with time until it began to cause him financial problems. These were partly solved by publishing a number of entomological articles in the Gardener's Chronicle, as "Ruricola", and in the Journal of the Royal Agricultural Society. This led to the profitable Farm Insects: Being the Natural History and Economy of the Insects Injurious to the Field Crops of Great Britain and Ireland published in 1860.

By the end of 1856 Curtis was totally blind, living at 18 Belitha-villas (now: Belitha Villas), Islington, London and receiving a civil list pension initially of £100 a year but later increased to £150. Many years after his death, when the original drawings for British Entomology were up for sale, there were fears that the precious collection would be split up. The whole collection was, however, purchased by Walter Rothschild and later bequeathed to the Natural History Museum, where they remain today.

He was a Fellow of the Linnaean Society of London from 1822, in 1833. He lent support to the founding of what became the Royal Entomological Society and served as its president from 1855 to 1857. He was an honorary member of the Société entomologique de France.

Obituary

From The Proceedings of the Linnaean Society 1862.

Note: This quotation is a verbatim transcript of the original text, including apparent text, spelling and grammatical faults.

"
Obituary of John Curtis (1791-1862)

In John Curtis we have lost one the most successful cultivators of British zoology and entomology, one of the most accomplished delineators of insects, and one of the closest observers of the phenomena of insect life.

Mr. Curtis was born at Norwich, on the 3rd of December 1791, and died on the 6th of October 1862.

His father having died before the son had reached his fourth year, his training developed upon his mother, whose love of flowers had no doubt great influence in the developing of that love of nature which he very early manifested.  It is related that his notice, as a child, having been attracted by the large hairy caterpillar of Arctia Caia, which, to his great astonishment and delight, was transformed, whilst under his care, into a beautiful moth, entomology at once became his ruling passion.  About this time, also, he became acquainted with an older and well-informed youth, Richard Walker, afterwards B.D, F.L.S., and Fellow of Magdalen, and the author of ‘Flora Oxoniensis’, in company with whom numerous excursions were made in the marshy districts surrounds his native place. He thus became much interested in the insects inhabiting and found upon the aquatic plants collected by his friend.  These pursuits, however, were interrupted by a severe and even dangerous attack of rheumatic fever.  On his recovery he was sent to school at Norwich, where he was again fortunate in making the acquaintance of a youth named Henry Browne, whose mother possessed a collection of British Lepidoptera, the inspection of which still further increased the zeal of Curtis in his old pursuits.  Whilst at school, he captured the rare Stauropus Fagi on the lime-trees surrounding the Cathedral Close – an insect then so rare as to be valued by collectors at the price of £5; and to the time of his death he preserved a specimen of the almost equally rare Heliothis dipsacea, which he had captured under his hat, on Mousehold Heath, near Norwich. At an early age, also, he manifested a great love for colouring small engravings, and making drawings of flowers and landscapes.  At this period his circle of acquaintance was enlarged by the addition to it of Dr. (afterwards Sir) James Edward Smith, and of the family of Mr. Hooker, the father of Sir W. J. Hooker.  The latter was at this time an ardent entomologist, and he was of great assistance to young Curtis in the naming of insects, and giving him rare and local species.  An excursion to the fens of Horning was rewarded by the capture of Papilio Machaon and its lava on Selinum palustre, as well of Hypogymna dispar.

When sixteen years of age, being obliged to choose a profession, he entered the office of a lawyer, although when there, dry legal technicalities were but little to his taste, and his desk probably contained more of natural history than of law.  After two years thus occupied, Mr, Curtis became acquainted with Mr. Simon Wilkin, a wealthy land proprietor in Norfolk, who like himself, was passionately devoted to entomology.  This gentleman, on reaching twenty-one, came to reside on his estate at Cossey Hall, where he invited Curtis to live with him as his companion.  Here, with a well-stored library, a well-named collection of insects, and congenial associates, the two friends spent their time most happily; and an entomological society was formed, in which the names of the Revs. W. Kirby and J. Burrell, Messrs. Wilkin, Brightwell, Joseph Hooker, John Lindley, Joseph Sparshall, and ten or twelve more were enrolled a members, - Mr. Wilkin acting  as President and Mr. Curtis as Secretary.

Mr. Wilkin having successfully studied Latreille’s ‘Genera Crustaceorum’, Curtis became so charmed with that naturalist’s system that he formed a resolution to describe and delineate all the genera, and thenceforward lost no opportunity of making dissections and drawings of the types of all he could obtain, or copies of figures of exotic genera from the most esteemed Continental works.  To promote his object, he acquired the art of etching and engraving on copper, his first published essay being the plates for Kirby and Spence’s ‘Introduction to Entomology’. Of these plates five only, containing figures illustrating the different orders of insects, were at first published, in the first and second volumes of that work, the third and fourth of which did not appear till 1826. The latter two contained twenty-five plates, filled with details of the external and internal anatomy of insects, twenty of which were etched by Curtis and five by Henry Denny, the dissections having been for the most part made by Mr. Kirby.

Mr. Curtis, at this time, frequently made sketches from nature; and about 1816 he cultivated, more especially, a taste he had long entertained for the drawing of churches, fonts, and monuments, the views being coloured on the spot.  A visit to Barham, the residence of the Rev. W. Kirby, led to his making the acquaintance of Mr. Spence and of Mr. W. S. MacLeay, friends who proved of the greatest utility to him.  Here he also assisted Mr. Kirby in dissecting and illustrating the forms contained in the famous ‘Century of Insects,’ and in the descriptions of Mr. Robert Brown’s ‘Australian Insects,’ published by Mr. Kirby in the 12th volume of our Transactions (1818).

In 1819 he accompanied Mr. Kirby to London, where he was introduced to Sir Joseph Banks, who gave him the entrée to his library and soirées, at which all the élite of the scientific world of London used to assemble.  He also became personally acquainted with Dr. Leach, Superintendent of the Zoological Collection of the Museum, their congenial tastes soon rendering them intimate friends, and leading Curtis to study the structure of shells and their inhabitants, in which pursuit Dr. Leach was so greatly interested that an arrangement was made to examine and dredge the whole coast of Scotland in search of Mollusca.  This excursion however, was never carried out, Dr. Leach’s mind having broken down under the accumulated labours which he had heaped upon himself.

The battle of life now began in earnest; and having thus lost the advice and assistance of the first zoologists whom England has ever produced, Mr. Curtis (by the evidence of Mr. MacLeay and other friends) turned his attention to botanical drawing and engraving, which led to engagements with Dr. Sims, and introduced him to the Horticultural Society (of which his friend Dr. Lindley was Secretary), the Linnaean Society, &c.  In 1822 he was elected a Fellow of this Society; and on the 1st of January 1824 appeared the first number of ‘British Entomology,’ “being Illustrations and Description of the genera of Insects found in Great Britain and Ireland, containing coloured figures from nature of the most rare and beautiful species, and in manty instances of the plants upon which they are found.”   This great work extended to sixteen annual volumes, containing no less than 770 plates, occupied by what the unanimous consent of entomologists has pronounced to be the most exquisite figures of the kind ever produced.  The work, as originally designed, was intended to embrace only a detailed description of the genus and of the species figured, accompanied with observations on the generic peculiarities of the group.  This limited scope was proposed, partly, because it was known that the late J. Francis Stephens had long been engaged in preparing for publication a work on the species of British insects, the first number of which appeared on the 1st of May 1827.  Entomologists, however, are but human; and it unfortunately happened that jealousies and ill-feeling soon arose between these two authors, which resulted, on the part of Mr. Curtis, in his introducing into his work, wherever possible, descriptions of each species of the different genera, or of lists of the species, at any rate when too numerous for description.  The author’s attention, from this circumstance, was in some measure withdrawn from the generic to the specific details, and accordingly, to the end, continued to confine his detailed generic figures to the structure of the antennae and parts of the mouth, omitting all mention, in many instances, of particulars concerning other parts, which more profound entomologists have shown to possess generic or family value.  The same spirit also led to the commencement of the publication of a second edition of the ‘British Entomology,’ in which detailed descriptions of known British species were intended to be given in the text; but of this second edition two parts only appeared.

In 1825, Mr. Curtis, in company with his friend Mr. Dale of Glanville’s Wooton, a most assiduous collector of British insects, made an entomological tour in Perthshire and the western isles of Scotland, returning by way of Edinburgh.  In this tour they were successful in collecting many very rare insects, together with thirty species not previously known as British, as well as numerous drawings of wild flowers for the illustration of Mr. Curtis’s great work.

In 1829 he published the first edition of a ‘Guide to an Arrangement of British Insects.’ “printed on one side, for labelling cabinets, being a Catalogue of all the names species hitherto discovered in Great Britain and Ireland,” a second edition of which useful work appeared in 1837.  In the following year, in company with Messrs. Francis and Henry Walker, he visited France, proceeding along the western edge of Bordeaux, and thence to Fréjus.  In this journey about 6000 specimens of insects were collected; but the great object of the party was to visit the gypsum-quarries at Aix in Provence, where fossil insects are frequently found, of which Mr. Curtis, in 1829, had already described in the ‘Edinburgh New Philosophical Journal,’ a number of species brought by Messrs. Murchison and Lyell.

In 1831 Mr. Curtis was elected Corresponding Member of the Royal Georgofili Society of Florence, and in the same year he published a “Description of the Insects brought home by Commander James Clark Ross in his Second Voyage,” forming part of the Appendix of Natural History.

In 1833, on the occasion of his reading a paper “On the Structure of Insects” before the Ashmolean Society of Oxford, he was elected an Honorary Member of that body; and in 1836 he received the same title from the Academy of Natural Sciences of Philadelphia.

On the completion of his ‘British Entomology,’ on the 1st of December 1839, Mr. Curtis sought for relaxation from the incessant application monthly required during the long space of sixteen years; but in 1841, his friend Dr. Lindley having commenced the ‘Gardeners’ Chronicle,’ Curtis undertook the entomological editorship, engaging to write articles on the insects injurious to gardeners and farmers, in a popular style, accompanied by figures on wood; and this task he continued to perform with unabating industry till 1847, when it was taken up by Mr. Westwood.

Having accumulated a large mass of materials relative to the economy of insects, and being invited by the Council of the Royal Agricultural Society of London to furnish reports upon the insects injurious to farm-crops, he visited Suffolk to consult the best farmers on the subject.  These valuable reports, amounting to sixteen in number, were commenced in 1841, and concluded in 1857.  They were published in the ‘Journal’ of the Society, each being illustrated by one or more plates containing figures of insects in their different stages, and have subsequently been collected together and published in a single volume, under the title of “Farm Insects, being the Natural History and Economy on the Insects injurious to the field-crops of Great Britain and Ireland, and also those which infest barns and granaries, with suggestions for their destruction.”

In 1843 Mr. Curtis made a tour in Italy, visiting Rome, Naples, and other principal cities of the south to enjoy the sight of the architectural and other artistic treasures of which he had read much when studying painting in his early life. In 1844 he left London, and went to reside at Hayes, near Uxbridge, where he occupied himself for five years studying the economy of noxious insects in the field and garden.

In 1849 he was elected a Corresponding Member of the National History Society of Nuremberg; and in 1855 he was chosen an Honorary Member of the Entomological Society of Paris, of which he had, however, been an ordinary Member since 1834. In the autumn and winter of 1850 he visited Nice, Genoa, Turin, and the North of Italy, returning by the Tyrol and Switzerland; and in the latter part of 1851, he visited Pau, the various cities along the Mediterranean, Venice, Florence, Lombardy, Switzerland, and France, continuing, nevertheless, to furnish communications on entomological subjects to various publications, and, amongst these, one to the ‘Linnaean Transactions,’ in 1852, “On the Economy of a New Species of Saw-fly (Selandria Robinsoni), the lavae of which feed upon Convallaria multiflora” and a “Notice regarding a Weevil of the vine and its Parasite (Rhynchites Betuleti)” in the ‘Proceedings’ for 1853; “On the genus Myrmica and other indigenous Ants,” in the ‘Linnaean Transactions,’ 1854, &c.

The publication of so national a work as the ‘British Entomology,’ together with the great practical utility of his numerous memoires on economic entomology, fully justified the grant of an annuity of £100 which was conferred some years since upon Mr. Curtis, and subsequently augmented by an additional £50 on the occurrence of a sad event which took place shortly after the first grant of the pension, namely, the total loss of sight, induced, it is supposed, by the overstraining of the eyes in the execution of his numerous and laborious works.
Resigned to this great misfortune, Mr. Curtis retired from scientific life, in which for forty years he taken such an active part; and soon afterwards his friends were grieved to learn that he was suffering from the severe illness which terminated in his decease last year.

The collection of British insects formed by Mr. Curtis is of great value, from its extent and the number of original types in all the different orders which it contains.  It is also a model of the greatest neatness and order. This, in fact, was one of the great peculiarities of Mr. Curtis, and pervaded all he did and all he possessed – his library being in the choicest condition, and his drawings most carefully finished. A little anecdote communicated to Mr. Westwood by Mr. Frederick Smith well illustrates this peculiarity.  Mr. Smith was employed to engrave some of the plates of the ‘British Entomology’ and of the memoires on ‘Farm Insects;’ and on one occasion when one of his plates was taken by Mr. Smith to be approved, Mr. Curtis, having carefully examined the impression for a considerable time, at last turned to Mr. Smith and said, “Sir, you have only put twelve hairs upon this fly’s tail instead of thirteen!”   This complaint, indicating so great a perception of precision, had such a droll effect, that the workmen could not resist a hearty laugh.

Personally, Mr. Curtis was very reserved in his communication with such of his brother entomologists as were known to be engaged in works intended for publication; but to those with whom he held unreserved intercourse his manners were engaging and kind. To use the words, in a letter to Mr. Westwood, of Mr. Halliday, who had enjoyed an uninterrupted friendship with Mr. Curtis of more than thirty years, “he was indeed very loveable, warm-hearted (too much so perhaps for his own tranquillity), pure-minded, and honourable.” "

Contacts
Curtis was a lifelong friend of the Irish entomologist Alexander Henry Haliday and of the London entomologist Francis Walker. Curtis met Haliday in December 1827, (following an exchange of letters and specimens) Curtis's second child was named Henry Alexander and Haliday was his godfather.

"I was delighted to possess Ceraphron Halidayii first because I had named it after you.... it is very essential to possess those insects I figure: the female of Scatophaga also was a most valuable addition. Tipula dispar I only had the male of, I never could understand the female but thought it had been killed before the wings were fully expanded, never having taken it myself and I need scarcely say there was not an insect you sent me that was not fully acceptable ...... I will put into the box some British Ichneumonidae hoping you will do me the favour at your leisure to append to them their Generic names and if you know them the specific also but not to take any trouble about it and whenever there are 2 alike I beg you will take one if desirable. Pray do me the favour to answer the different questions in this letter as I have no copy or memorandum. I shall hope to hear shortly from you and sincerely wishing you in a good old English Phrase a Merry Christmas and Happy New Year. Yours most faithfully, John Curtis" Curtis to Haliday 22 December 1832.

"To Alexander Henry Haliday, Esq., M.A., &c, of Belfast, whose extensive knowledge and munificent contributions, have so greatly enriched this work and whose kindness and friendship in its progress have been an uninterrupted source of gratification, to the author, this volume (British Entomology VII Homoptera. Hemiptera. Aphaniptera) is dedicated as a token of sincere regard". London 1 December 1837.

"It has for several years been my wish to pay you the only public testimony in my power of my regard by dedicating a volume of my work to you. The many and essential services you have rendered that work during its progress would entitle you to such a compliment were you only a correspondent and the numerous proofs I had of your kindness and friend-ship make me only regret that it will not be better with your acceptance. I assure you one of the greatest pleasures in the progress of my great undertaking has been the associating my name with those whom I esteem and who like myself fare devote to the study of our branch of Natural History I may have only two more opportunities of thus gratifying myself and I shall be truly happy if they afford me the same unmixed pleasures as the present one does" ...Curtis to Haliday 2 December 1837.

Selected works
1 January 1824 – 1 December 1839: First edition of British Entomology comprising detailed description of the insects of Great Britain and Ireland with 770 hand-coloured plates and over 2,000 species described. Issued in 192 monthly parts over 16 years to an initial list of 167 subscribers, yet less than 35 complete copies of the first edition were finally produced. Universally acknowledged as being the finest work concerning British entomology ever produced. The exceptionally fine images included the most accurate botanical illustrations that have yet to be bettered. Note: Title pages incorrectly show publication dates as 1823–1840.
1837 second edition of A Guide to the Arrangement of British Insects being a catalogue of all the named species hitherto discovered in Great Britain and Ireland. Six pages of introductory matter are followed by 282 columns of insect names in two columns per page systematically arranged and followed by an index to genera. This work attributed to John Curtis was in fact co-authored by James Charles Dale, Francis Walker and Alexander Henry Haliday; Haliday and Walker writing almost the whole of the sections on Diptera and parasitic Hymenoptera. The list contains 1500 generic and 15,000 specific names. Britain and Ireland are not separated.
1860 Farm Insects: Being the Natural History and Economy of the Insects Injurious to the Field Crops of Great Britain and Ireland with Suggestions for Their Destruction Glasgow, Blackie. (See External Links Google Books)

Collections
John Curtis' insect collection is divided between the National Museum of Ireland – Natural History (via Trinity College Dublin, 7,656 specimens purchased by Thomas Coulter) and Museums Victoria in Melbourne, Australia, which purchased the John Curtis Collection of British and Foreign Insects—comprising 38,031 specimens—for £567 in 1862. Museums Victoria also holds the Curtis Agricultural Insect Collection, which documents British agricultural pest insects.

References

Further reading
Ordish, G. (1974). John Curtis and the Pioneering of Pest Control. Reading: Osprey.
Hooper, J. (2004). "Curtis, John (1791–1862)". In Oxford Dictionary of National Biography. Oxford University Press.
Gage, A.; Stearn, W. (2008). A Bicentenary History of the Linnean Society of London. London: Published for the Linnean Society of London by Academic Press.

External links
 John Curtis Collection
 Account of British Entomology and scanned plates with updated names of all the insects and plants illustrated
 King's College
 Glasgow Library Archive
 BHL Digitised Farm Insects
 DEI ZALF Excellent reference list.
EOL Encyclopedia of Life Taxa described by John Curtis. Complete. Sometimes has very detailed links to older literature.

Systema Dipterorum Nomenclator Full list of Diptera taxa described by John Curtis
Gaedike, R.; Groll, E. K. & Taeger, A. 2012: Bibliography of the entomological literature from the beginning until 1863: online database - version 1.0 - Senckenberg Deutsches Entomologisches Institut.

1791 births
1862 deaths
19th-century British zoologists
19th-century English artists
19th-century male artists
19th-century naturalists
English entomologists
English illustrators
Fellows of the Linnean Society of London
Hymenopterists
Artists from Norwich
Presidents of the Royal Entomological Society
Scientific illustrators
Scientists from Norwich